Jan Erik Mikalsen (born 6 May 1979 in Kristiansund, Norway) is a Norwegian composer of contemporary music, living in Oslo.

Biography 
Mikalsen studied at the Grieg Academy in Bergen and the Royal Danish Academy of Music in Copenhagen, and is a member of the Norwegian Society of Composers. He has composed a number of works performed and commissioned by orchestras like Oslo Philharmonic Orchestra, Tokyo Philharmonic Orchestra, Bergen Philharmonic Orchestra, Stavanger Symphony Orchestra, Norrköping Symphony Orchestra, Kringkastingsorkesteret, Oslo Sinfonietta, Bodø Sinfonietta, Thomas Bloch, Reykjavik Chamber Orchestra, Quartet Artis Wien, Stavanger Samtidsensemble, Orchestre de Flutes Francais, Manger Musikklag, Ingrid Torvund, Tori Wrånes and Bård Ask. He has participated in festivals such as Présences Festival, Pablo Casals Festival, Ultima Oslo Contemporary Music Festival, Casa Da Musica, Performa 13, Young Nordic Music and Nordic Music Days.

Mikalsen also won the award from the Kavlifondet, and the Stavanger Symphony Orchestra's Nordic / Baltic Composers Workshop 2004-2005 with the work Ghouls & Moons premiered by the same orchestra under the main series, on October 20, 2005. His collaboration with visual artist Bård Ash during 2013 and 2014 has resulted in a number of works, including Notio Viri Placet shown in Bergen, London, Paris and Oslo.

In January 2010 Björn Nyman and Kringkastingsorkesteret premiered the work Clarinet Concerto at stage 2, in The Norwegian Opera and Ballet in Oslo. In 2014 the commissioned work Music for solo flute and sinfonietta was premiered by Elisabeth Kristensen Eide and Bodø Sinfonietta. January 20, 2012, the work Parts II for Orchestra was premiered by the Tokyo Philharmonic Orchestra, as one of four works in the finals of Toru Takemitsu Composition Award competition (referee Salvatore Sciarrino). The same composition won the Edvardprisen in 2012. The work Wagner Prelude was commissioned by Queen Sonja International Music Competition in 2013 and premiered in the main hall in Den Norske Opera by the opera orchestra during the final concert. In autumn 2014 Kringkastingsorkesteret premiered the commissioned work Songs for Orchestra. The BIT20 Ensemble commissioned the work Too much of a good thing which was premiered in autumn 2014 a new commissioned work for solo piano and sinfonietta in Bergen. The work was again performed under the Huddersfield Contemporary Music Festival in England that year. Mikalsen was awarded Intro composer for the period 2014-2016. The composition Songs for Orchestra won the 2015 International Rostrum of Composers (IRC), organized by the International Music Council, and it will be broadcast in some 30 countries around the world. September 2017 saw the Oslo Philharmonic Orchestra premiering Mikalsen's latest orchestral work, Just for You for Piano Solo and Orchestra, featuring Ellen Ugelvik as piano soloist and conductor Lars-Erik Ter Jung.

Honors 
2011: Parts II for Orchestra received a 3rd place at the Toru Takemitsu Composition Award in Tokyo judged by Salvatore Sciarrino
2012: Winner of the Edvardprisen for the work Parts II for Orchestra premiered by Tokyo Philharmonic Orchestra
2015: Winner of the 62nd International Rostrum of Composers (IRC) in the general category for the composition Songs For Orchestra

Production

Selected works

Orchestral works 
 Just for You for Piano Solo and Orchestra (2017)
 Songr Parts II for Orchestra (2017)
 Songr for Orchestra (2014)
 Parts II for Orchestra (2012) 
 Clarinet Concerto (2010)
 Parts for Orchestra (2009)
 Wagner Prelude (2013) 
 Ghouls & Moons (2005) 
 Garbage Sun (2003). 
 Saws of Pygar (2006)

Works for sinfonietta 
 Too much of a good thing is wonderful  (2014) 
 Concerto for Ondes Martenot and Sinfonietta (2008)

Chamber music 
 Sonette (2015) 
 Lied (2012) 
 Songs (2012) 
 Weeps & Ghosts (2006) 
 Night songs (2007) 
 La Disparition des Fantômes (2007)

Duo works 
 Play Fun (2008) 
 Folk Tunes (2007)

Solo works 
 Sonate for piano (2012)
 Pieces for Violin (2010)
 More Play Fun (2008)
 Angel Stories (2005)

Works for video and exhibitions 
 Magic Blood Machine (2012)
 Monument: Hymn for Giant Bowl for marching band  (2009)
 Ni Estas Movado (2006)

Discography (in selection) 
2006: Lights Out, with the Norwegian Radio Orchestra
2010: Black Spaces, with pianist Kristian Lindberg the piece "Angels Stories"
2012: Nine solos for nine violinists, Guro Kleven Hagen
2017: Saan, with Oslo-Filharmonien/Kringkastingsorkestret/POING, nominated for the contemporary Spellemannprisen

References

External links 

List of works supplied by the National Library of Norway

Norwegian contemporary classical composers
21st-century classical composers
21st-century Norwegian composers
Grieg Academy alumni
Royal Danish Academy of Music alumni
International Rostrum of Composers prize-winners
Musicians from Kristiansund
1979 births
Living people
Norwegian expatriates in Denmark
Norwegian male classical composers
21st-century Norwegian male musicians